Axel Gyllenkrok, or Gyllenkrook (2 August 1664 – 17 September 1730) was a Swedish baron, military general, and governor of Gothenburg. He is best known as being the general quartermaster of King Charles XII of Sweden.
He was the operational planner whose collections of route maps and reports were used by Charles XII to prepare for the campaign in Poland and Russia.

After the King's defeat in the Battle of Poltava (8 July 1709), Gyllenkrok followed the King to the Ottoman Empire. Shortly afterwards, he was captured by the forces of Peter I of Russia at a mission in Poland. He was moved between multiple places during his captivity, including Moscow and Kazan, and did not return to Sweden until 1722 after the signing of the Treaty of Nystad.

References

article Gyllenkrok, Axel from Nordisk familjebok (in Swedish)
"Axel Gyllenkrok". Svensk biograpfiskt lexikon. Retrieved December 12, 2021.

External links
Av annan mening: karolinen Axel Gyllenkrok by Alf Åberg 

1665 births
1730 deaths
Swedish generals
Swedish nobility
Governors of Gothenburg and Bohus County